Wangshu or Wang-Shu or variation, may refer to:

Places
 Former Shu (907-925 ), a former country of the 10 Kingdoms, during the Five Dynasties and Ten Kingdoms period of Chinese history
 Wangshu (extinguished 563 BC; ; ㄨㄤˊ ㄕㄨ) a former country in Chinese history during the Spring and Autumn period
 Wangshu, Hebei, Yanshan, Hebei, China; a town; see List of township-level divisions of Hebei
 HD 173416 b (planet), Star Xihe, Constellation Lyra; an exoplanet named after the Chinese goddess 望舒 who drives the moon

People
 Wang Shu (born 1963; ; Shu Wang), Chinese architect
 Wang Shu (3rd century BC; ; Shu Wang), grandson of Wang Chang (Three Kingdoms)
 Duke Wen of Wangshu (died 624 BC), son of King Xi of Zhou
 Dai Wangshu (1905-1950), Chinese poet
 Wnagnam Wangshu (politician), an Indian politician of the Janata Party; see Pongchau-Wakka (Vidhan Sabha constituency)

Other uses
 Wangshu (aka Xian'e meaning beauty), Chinese goddess who drives the Moon across the sky in Chinese mythology
 Wanshū aka Wangshu; a kata in Japanese karate

See also

 
 
 
 
 Shu (disambiguation)
 Wang (disambiguation)
 Shu Wang (disambiguation)